Goat Town is an unincorporated community in Washington County, in the U.S. state of Georgia.

History
The community was so named on account of a large herd of goats kept by the proprietor of a county store at the town site.

References

Unincorporated communities in Washington County, Georgia
Unincorporated communities in Georgia (U.S. state)